Blueskin Bay is an estuary in coastal Otago, about 25 km north of Dunedin, New Zealand.
The name also unofficially describes the rural district which includes the northern slopes of Mount Cargill, the southern slopes of the Kilmog, and the townships of Doctors Point, Waitati, Evansdale, Warrington, and Seacliff.

Place names

The tidal lagoon is known in Māori as Waiputai. "Blueskin Bay" historically referred to a wider stretch of coast from Heyward Point to Seacliff, including Pūrākaunui. The name Blueskin is after  Kahuti, a resident Maori personality of the area, whom Pakeha settlers nicknamed "Blueskin" for the large amount of Tā moko (traditional Maori tattooing) on his body. The name had been used as the nickname of a notorious 18th-century London criminal, Joseph "Blueskin" Blake.

The estuary

The Waitati River and Careys Creek enter Blueskin Bay at its southwest and northwest corners. A long sand spit from the northern headland closes the bay to a small channel to the Pacific Ocean at the southeast corner. Rabbit Island lies just inside this entrance.

Critically endangered, endemic Hector's dolphins live around the bay.

Shellfish

Blueskin Bay is a popular site for gathering clams, locally known as "cockles". Along with families collecting the shellfish for personal consumption, Southern Clams Ltd collects clams commercially for export.

References

External links

 Blueskin Bay community news website

Estuaries of New Zealand
Landforms of Otago
Bays of Otago
Wetlands of Otago